László Sólyom (born 3 January 1942) is a Hungarian political figure, lawyer, and librarian who was President of Hungary from 2005 until 2010. Previously he was Chief Justice of the Constitutional Court of Hungary from 1990 to 1998.

Biography 
He was born in the southern Hungarian city of Pécs. He graduated in law from the University of Pécs in 1965. He worked as a professor at universities and law institutes in Budapest: at the Faculty of Law of the Eötvös Loránd University from 1983 to 1993, at Péter Pázmány Catholic University from 1996 to 2005. He also worked at the University of Jena, Germany for 3 years and earned the Dr. jur. title.

His political career began as legal advisor for civil and environmental organisations in the late 1980s. As a founder of Danube Circle, he also had a significant role in environmental protection issues like preventing the construction of the Gabčíkovo - Nagymaros Dams which, according to the Danube Circle, would have damaged the habitat of a northern part of the Danube. He was one of the founders of the Hungarian Democratic Forum (MDF) in 1987, and represented that party in the Opposition Roundtable negotiations that played a very important part in Hungary's transition to parliamentary democracy. In 1989, for a short time he was member of the executive committee of the MDF.

However, he left party politics in late 1989, as he was elected into the newly established Constitutional Court of Hungary. He was elected for president of the court by the fellow judges half year later, and held that position until 1998. During this time, the Constitutional Court had a very important role in laying the groundwork for and strengthening democracy in Hungary. In this role, he significantly contributed to the removal of capital punishment, the protection of information and environmental rights, the freedom of opinion and of conscience, as well as the constitutional protection of domestic partnerships of homosexuals, which measures brought wide international acclaim for the Constitutional Court of Hungary.

He had a controversial principle of activism based on the invisible constitution, motivating the decisions of the Court by the 'spirit' or 'morals' of the Constitution rather than its explicitly written form, advocating the principle of equality and the human dignity even over the letters of the constitution. In his concurring opinion in the judgement on the unconbstitutionality of capital pounishment he writes: "In this context, the starting point is the Constitution as a whole. The Constitutional Court must continue its effort to explain the theoretical bases of the Constitution and the rights included in it and to form a coherent system with its decisions which as an „invisible Constitution” provides for a reliable standard of constitutionality beyond the Constitution, which nowadays is often amended out of current political interests."

After the end of his nine-year-long mandate, he continued his scholarly career, continued giving lectures in universities, and became founder of Védegylet, an environmentalist and civil rights non-governmental organisation in 2000. He became corresponding member of the Hungarian Academy of Sciences in 2001 and a full member in 2013.

He was member of the International Commission of Jurists (Geneva) 1994-2001, member of the advisory board of the Berlin Institute for Advanced Study (1995-2001).

Sólyom is widowed, has two children and eleven grandchildren.

Presidential election 
He was nominated by the environmentalist civil organisation Védegylet, including notable public figures from both the left and the right wing. As the Constitution of Hungary specifies, the President is elected by the Parliament of Hungary, so he had to acquire the support of Parliamentary parties. The opposition parties, Fidesz and Hungarian Democratic Forum, also endorsed him to become President of Hungary. However, if the governing parties had been united in support of the Hungarian Socialist Party candidate, Katalin Szili, Sólyom would not have secured enough votes to take the Presidency; but because Szili was not acceptable to the Alliance of Free Democrats, the smaller party in the governing coalition, they abstained from voting, and Sólyom's election was secured.

The three pillars of the presidency of László Sólyom 
 Maintaining the values of the rule of law in Hungary
 Expressing distinctive responsibility for the ethnic Hungarian minority groups living abroad in the neighboring countries of Hungary
 Calling the Hungarian and the international public’s attention to environmental and ecological issues, such as the importance of biodiversity or the risks of climate change

Relevant public events of President László Sólyom

2005
5 August László Sólyom was inaugurated in his office at a ceremony in the Mirror Hall of Sándor Palace.

20 August In his first ceremonial speech he formulated that “Let us be aware that we are a medium-sized country among the EU Member States, and we, too, are contributing to shaping whatever is to happen and what could happen in the European Union.” (full text)

8 December In his toast at the gala-dinner offered by Ivan Ğašparovič, President of the Slovak Republic, László Sólyom underlined that "The peoples' memory keeps the offences through generations and to avoid that these become prejudice and in order to ease them it is necessary to set them on the agenda to clear comprehensive historical processes and inherences, to eliminate taboo subjects and to show mutual empathy." (full text)

2006
27 January In his address on the Memorial Day of the Holocaust he said that “The absolute breaking of law that happened is confirming the law not only for the people which suffered of it but for the whole unity of mankind. It makes the prohibition absolute.” (full text)

16 May At the inaugural session of the new Parliament he started his speech by reminding that “The election campaign is over and now we need to change the style in which we communicate with one another. It is time to look at the facts, make decisions and take responsibility for them.” (full text)

22 June At the bilateral meeting with George W. Bush the President of the United States of America he mentioned in his introduction that “It is my firm believe that our common responsibility is to fight terrorism but this fight can be successful only if every steps and the measures taken are in line with international law.” (full text)

18 September After the Prime Minister's scandalous speech became public President László Sólyom stressed in his statement that “The citizens are losing the possibility for responsible decision if the statements, promises and programs made in front of the public are not corresponding to the truth, to the real intentions.” (full text)

19 September Reacting to the previous night’s event as a group parted from the peaceful demonstrations attacked the building of the Hungarian Television President Sólyom stated that “Let be a consequence for the political forces that the cynical avoidance of basic moral questions is unacceptable and likewise is unacceptable even the hidden justification of acts breaking constitutional borders.” (full text)

1 October In his Speech on the evening of the 2006 local elections he claimed that “The Parliament decides on the person of the Prime Minister. The Parliament can restore the required social confidence. The key to the solution lies with the parliamentary majority.” (full text)

22 October In his address of the Republic of Hungary on the occasion of the 50th Anniversary of the 1956 Revolution and Freedom Fight he said that ”When we celebrate 1956, we must recall and celebrate the elementary and clear joy of being free again, which is what we felt then.” (full text)

16 November In his speech at the Matthias Bel University of Banská Bystrica where he carried on a dialogue in the frame of a conversation in public with President Ivan Gašparovič and with university students he formulated that “Allow me to love the whole of our country, which in the past used to be common.” (full text, full text in Slovak)

2007
14 March In his address at the State Hungarian Opera House of Cluj-Napoca Marking the anniversary of Hungary’s 1848/49 Revolution and War of Independence he underlined that “One in every ten citizens of the European Union lives as a minority in some nation-state. The EU has to manage this issue in harmony with its own basic principles. As Europe unites, the rights of minorities to protection have been growing explosively.” (full text)

23 May In his address at the presentation of the nominee for minority rights to the leaders of the parliamentary factions he said that “The Roma are exposed the most to the dangers of injustice […], handling their problems requires special knowledge and empathy.” (full text) Ernő Kállai had been elected later as the first ethnic Roma leader of a constitutional institution in Hungary.

10 September In his address on the first day of the autumn session of Parliament he claimed that “The menace of the radical right lies precisely in its effort to turn differences between people into an ideology and a platform. Since that opposes the basic ideals of human dignity, it is unacceptable.” (full text)

8 November In his speech at the World Science Forum he claimed that “Globalization only can benefit the world if powerful international environmental governance sets it on a path of sustainability and keeps it there.” (full text)

27 December In his statement about the return of the bill to the Parliament for reconsideration on health insurance funds and the order of requisition of the compulsory health insurance service in kind he underlined that “I agree that the healthcare system must undergo reform. However, unless people trust and support a reform of this nature, it cannot succeed.” (full text)

2008
3 March In his address to the plenary session of the Knesset he stressed that “Hungarian politics does not and will not remain silent on matters of racism, xenophobia and the violation of human and minority rights. In its response, however, it strives to retain the broadest possible respect of civil liberties.” (full text)

19 August In his address at a memorial ceremony marking the fortieth anniversary of the crushing of Prague Spring he said that “An apology is particularly appropriate if the person or body that caused the injury voices its regrets to the victim. However, it also has a place when the blameless heirs make it clear that they are sorry for the deeds of their forebearers and disapprove of them.” (full text)

2009
27 June In his ceremonious at a memorial meeting to mark the 20th anniversary of the dismantling of the Iron Curtain he stated that “The cut barbed wire fence was an immediate symbol that helped the whole world to understand what was happening here, in the centre of Europe.” (full text)

21 August President László Sólyom could not hold a speech at the unveiling of a statue of Saint Stephen in Komarno as Slovak authorities refused the entry of the Hungarian head of state to the territory of the Slovak Republic. At the ceremony Antal Heizer Hungarian ambassador to Slovakia read the speech of President. (full text, full text in Slovak)

5 November In his address to the World Science Forum he said that “Ecological revolution is a term stressed in the book Limits to Growth: The 30-Year Update. But, considering the fact that ecological crisis can run hand-in-hand with social disasters and violent conflicts, it is particularly important for the revolution to be a peaceful one.” (full text)

2 December In his comment on the COP 15 homepage he reminded that “In general, this observed climate change is proceeding at a more rapid pace than anticipated by previous estimates or model projections.” (full text)

Controversies 
As president-elect Sólyom promised not to visit the U.S. as long as it requires him to be fingerprinted at the border.

He refused to shake hands with János Fekete, former vice president of the Hungarian National Bank before the end of Communism in Hungary. The incident happened while presenting an award to Fekete that the Gyurcsány cabinet forced through, despite strong objections to that nomination due to Fekete's past as a hardline communist.

In 2007, he refused to award a similar distinction to Gyula Horn. He referred to the fact that Horn had not changed his views on the 1956 revolution in which he had taken part on the Soviet side, fighting against the Hungarian revolutionaries. Sólyom said that this (i.e., Horn's opinion) conflicts with the constitutional values of the Republic of Hungary, and that he could not give the award to Horn, despite his merits.

In 2009, Sólyom was refused entry to Slovakia to attend the dedication of a statue of King Saint Stephen in the border town of Komárno on 21 August, an incident reported in Hungary as tantamount to a declaration of persona non grata which further worsened already tense Hungary–Slovakia relations. Sólyom said that "this is a situation unheard of, inexcusable and unexplainable in the relationship of two allied countries." Slovakia's government, containing the ultranationalist SNS party, claimed that the Hungarian President's presence is a "threat to national security". Sólyom came back to visit the same statue a year later in August 2010, after Slovak voters ousted the previous government; the ceremony at the statue took place without incident. The Court of Justice of the European Union ruled in October 2012 that the prohibition on his entry into Slovakia in 2009 did not compromise his freedom of movement as an EU citizen (Hungary and Slovakia both being members of the European Union) because his role as a Head of State justified a limit, based on international law, to his right to freedom of movement.

Honours
 : Grand Cross of the Order of Merit of the Republic of Hungary (1999)
 : Grand Cross with Star and Sash of the Order of Merit of the Federal Republic of Germany (1998)
 : Grand Cross of the Order of the Cross of Terra Mariana (27 March 2006)
 : Grand Cross of the Order of the Three Stars (31 August 2006)
 : Grand Cross with Chain of the Order of Vytautas the Great (31 August 2006)
 : Grand Cross with Chain of the Order of Isabella the Catholic (25 May 2007)
 : Grand Cross with Chain of the National Order of Merit (31 May 2007)
 : Grand Cross of the National Order of Merit (2 June 2007)
 : First Class of the Order of Friendship (23 November 2007)
 : Grand Cross with Chain of the Order of Prince Yaroslav the Wise (7 July 2008)
 : Grand Cross with Diamonds of the Order of the Sun of Peru (24 September 2008)

References

External links 
 The Office of the President of the Republic of Hungary
 His biography at the above site
 Biography on his campaign site
 Website of the civil organisation Védegylet, which nominated him
 The campaign site made by Védegylet
 His profile by Index

|-

1942 births
Living people
People from Pécs
Presidents of Hungary
Hungarian Democratic Forum politicians
20th-century Hungarian lawyers
Hungarian librarians
Politicians of Catholic political parties
Members of the Hungarian Academy of Sciences
Recipients of the Collar of the Order of the Cross of Terra Mariana
Recipients of the Order of Prince Yaroslav the Wise, 1st class
Grand Crosses with Star and Sash of the Order of Merit of the Federal Republic of Germany
Grand Crosses with Golden Chain of the Order of Vytautas the Great
University of Pécs alumni
Academic staff of Eötvös Loránd University
Constitutional Court of Hungary judges